Yagdyg is a rural locality (a selo) in Khuchninsky Selsoviet, Tabasaransky District, Republic of Dagestan, Russia. The population was 989 as of 2010. There are 2 streets.

Geography 
Yagdyg is located 5 km northeast of Khuchni (the district's administrative centre) by road. Tatil is the nearest rural locality.

References 

Rural localities in Tabasaransky District